L'Esprit Nouveau was a magazine founded by architect Le Corbusier, poet Paul Dermée, and painter Amédée Ozenfant in 1920. The publication addressed a wide range of artistic disciplines including literature, visual arts, and architecture.

The articles written by Le Corbusier for L'Esprit Nouveau comprise a number of those appearing in his seminal 1923 book Toward an Architecture.

L'Esprit Nouveau remained in publication, until 1925, releasing a total of 28 copies

References

External links
L'Esprit Nouveau_Biblioteca di Area delle Arti sezione Architettura "Enrico Mattiello"

1920 establishments in France
1925 disestablishments in France
Le Corbusier
Defunct literary magazines published in France
Design magazines
French-language magazines
Magazines established in 1920
Magazines disestablished in 1925
French art publications